Catherine Ferrar (born October 22, 1946) is an American television actress. She is mostly known for playing the character of Julie Olson Williams on Days of Our Lives in 1967–1968 (before Susan Seaforth-Hayes) and for the lead role of Nancy Murphy in the show The Sixth Sense with Gary Collins. She also guest starred in various shows of the seventies and eighties such as CHiPs and Matt Houston.

External links

January 1972 article on Catherine Ferrar
May 1972 article on Catherine Ferrar

American soap opera actresses
American television actresses
1946 births
Place of birth missing (living people)
Living people
20th-century American actresses
21st-century American women